By the end of the 1940s, the nervous energy and tension of bebop was replaced with a tendency towards calm and smoothness, with the sounds of cool jazz, which favoured long, linear melodic lines. It emerged in New York City, as a result of the mixture of the styles of predominantly white swing jazz musicians and predominantly black bebop musicians, and it dominated jazz in the first half of the 1950s. The starting point were a series of singles on Capitol Records in 1949 and 1950 of a nonet led by trumpeter Miles Davis, collected and released first on a ten-inch and later a twelve-inch as the Birth of the Cool. Cool jazz recordings by Chet Baker, Dave Brubeck, Bill Evans, Gil Evans, Stan Getz and the Modern Jazz Quartet usually have a "lighter" sound which avoided the aggressive tempos and harmonic abstraction of bebop. Cool jazz later became strongly identified with the West Coast jazz scene, but also had a particular resonance in Europe, especially Scandinavia, with emergence of such major figures as baritone saxophonist Lars Gullin and pianist Bengt Hallberg. The theoretical underpinnings of cool jazz were set out by the blind Chicago pianist Lennie Tristano, and its influence stretches into such later developments as Bossa nova, modal jazz, and even free jazz. See also the list of cool jazz and West Coast musicians for further detail.
 
Hard bop, an extension of bebop (or "bop") music that incorporates influences from rhythm and blues, gospel music, and blues, especially in the saxophone and piano playing,  developed in the mid-1950s, partly in response to the vogue for cool jazz in the early 1950s.  The hard bop style coalesced in 1953 and 1954, paralleling the rise of rhythm and blues. Miles Davis' performance of "Walkin'" the title track of his album of the same year, at the first Newport Jazz Festival in 1954, announced the style to the jazz world. The quintet Art Blakey and the Jazz Messengers, fronted by Blakey and featuring pianist Horace Silver and trumpeter Clifford Brown, were leaders in the hard bop movement along with Davis. (See also List of Hard bop musicians)

Modal jazz recordings, such as Miles Davis's Kind of Blue, became popular in the late 1950s. Popular modal standards include Davis's "All Blues" and "So What" (both 1959), John Coltrane's "Impressions" (1963) and Herbie Hancock's "Maiden Voyage" (1965). Later, Davis's "second great quintet", which included saxophonist Wayne Shorter and pianist Herbie Hancock, recorded a series of highly acclaimed albums in the mid-to-late 1960s. Standards from these sessions include Shorter's "Footprints" (1966) and Eddie Harris's "Freedom Jazz Dance" (1966).

In Brazil, a new style of music called bossa nova evolved in the late 1950s. The free jazz movement, coming to prominence in the late 1950s, spawned very few standards. Free jazz's unorthodox structures and performance techniques are not as amenable to transcription as other jazz styles. However, "Lonely Woman" (1959) a blues by saxophonist Ornette Coleman, is perhaps the closest thing to a standard in free jazz, having been recorded by dozens of notable performers.

1950s jazz standards

1950–1954

 1950 – "If I Were a Bell". Written by Frank Loesser.
 1951 – "Night Train" Composed by Jimmy Forrest, Lewis P. Simpkins and Oscar Washington.
 1951 – "Straight, No Chaser". Composed by Thelonious Monk
 1952 – "Lullaby of Birdland". Composed by George Shearing with lyrics by George David Weiss.
 1952 – "My One and Only Love" Composed by Guy Wood with lyrics by Robert Mellin.
 1952 – "That's All". Written by Bob Haymes and Alan Brandt.
 1952 – "When I Fall in Love". Composed by Victor Young with lyrics by Edward Heyman.
 1953 – "Here's That Rainy Day". Composed by Jimmy Van Heusen with lyrics by Johnny Burke.
 1953 – "Jordu". Composed by Duke Jordan.
 1953 – "Satin Doll". Composed by Duke Ellington and Billy Strayhorn with lyrics by Johnny Mercer.
 1954 – "Airegin". Composed by Sonny Rollins.
 1954 – "All of You". Written by Cole Porter.
 1954 – "Blue Monk". Composed by Thelonious Monk.
 1954 – "Django". Composed by John Lewis.
 1954 – "Doxy". Composed by Sonny Rollins.
 1954 – "Fly Me to the Moon" (a.k.a. "In Other Words"). Written by Bart Howard.
 1954 – "Joy Spring". Composed by Clifford Brown with lyrics by Jon Hendricks.
 1954 – "Misty". Composed by Erroll Garner with lyrics by Johnny Burke.
 1954 – "Oleo". Composed by Sonny Rollins.
 1954 – "Solar". Composed by Miles Davis.

1955–1959
 1956 – "Au Privave". – Bebop composition by Charlie Parker.
 1956 – "Blues for Alice". Composed by Charlie Parker.
 1956 – "Canadian Sunset". Composed by Eddie Heywood with lyrics by Norman Gimbel.
 1956 – "Con Alma". Composed by Dizzy Gillespie.
 1956 – "Nica's Dream". Composed by Horace Silver.
 1956 – "Waltz for Debby". Composed by Bill Evans with lyrics by Gene Lees.
 1957 – "Blue Train". – Jazz blues composition by John Coltrane from his album Blue Train.
 1957 – "I Remember Clifford". Composed by Benny Golson with lyrics by Jon Hendricks.
 1958 – "Bags' Groove". Composed by Milt Jackson.
 1958 – "Chega de Saudade" (a.k.a. "No More Blues"). Composed by Antonio Carlos Jobim with lyrics by Vinicius de Moraes (Portuguese) and Jon Hendricks and Jessie Cavanaugh (English).
 1958 – "Milestones". Composed by Miles Davis.
 1959 – "Afro Blue". Composed by Mongo Santamaría.
 1959 – "All Blues". Composed by Miles Davis.
 1959 – "The Best Is Yet to Come". Composed by Cy Coleman with lyrics by Carolyn Leigh.
 1959 – "Blue in Green". – Modal jazz composition from Miles Davis's album Kind of Blue. Credited solely to Davis on Kind of Blue and to Davis and Bill Evans on Evans's Portrait in Jazz, the song's authorship is disputed; Evans and Earl Zindars claim that Evans alone composed the tune.
 1959 – "Desafinado" (a.k.a. "Slightly Out of Tune", also "Off Key"). Composed by Antonio Carlos Jobim with lyrics by Newton Mendonça (Portuguese), and Jon Hendricks and Jessie Cavanaugh (English).
 1959 – "Freddie Freeloader". Composed by Miles Davis.
 1959 – "Giant Steps". Composed by John Coltrane.
 1959 – "Goodbye Pork Pie Hat". Composed by Charles Mingus.
 1959 – "Goodbye Tristesse" (a.k.a. "A Felicidade"). Composed by Antonio Carlos Jobim with lyrics by Vinicius de Moraes (Portuguese) and Hal Shaper (English).
 1959 – "Killer Joe". Composed by Benny Golson.
 1959 – "Manhã de Carnaval" (a.k.a. "A Day in the Life of a Fool", also "Black Orpheus"). Written by Luiz Bonfá and Antônio Maria with English lyrics by Carl Sigman.
 1959 – "Mr. P.C.". Composed by John Coltrane.
 1959 – "My Favorite Things". Composed by Richard Rodgers with lyrics by Oscar Hammerstein II.
 1959 – "Naima" (a.k.a. "Niema"). Composed by John Coltrane.
 1959 – "Nostalgia in Times Square". Written by Charles Mingus.
 1959 – "Sidewinder". Composed by Lee Morgan.
 1959 – "So What". Composed by Miles Davis.
 1959 – "Take Five". Composed by Paul Desmond.

1950

Album releases
Miles Davis: Birth of the Cool 
Stan Kenton: Presents 
Ralph Sutton: Ralph Sutton 
Lennie Tristano: Wow
Stan Getz: Quartets

Deaths
Fats Navarro (September 24, 1923 – July 7)

1951

Album releases
Stan Kenton: City of Glass 
Oscar Peterson: 1951
Shorty Rogers: Modern Sounds

1952

Album releases
Gerry Mulligan: Mulligan Quartet
Johnny Smith: Moonlight in Vermont

Deaths
Midge Williams (May 27, 1915 – January 9)
John Kirby (December 31, 1908 – June 14)
Fletcher Henderson (December 18, 1897 – December 28)

1953

Album releases
Duke Ellington: Piano Reflections 
Ben Webster: King of the Tenors 
Shorty Rogers: Cool and Crazy
Jay Jay Johnson: Four Trombones

Deaths
Django Reinhardt (January 23, 1910 – May 16)

1954

Album releases
Frank Sinatra: Songs for Young Lovers
Sarah Vaughan: Sarah Vaughan 
Chet Baker: Sextet
Tal Farlow: The Tal Farlow Quartet 
Tal Farlow: The Tal Farlow Album
John Serry Sr.: RCA Thesaurus featuring John Serry & his ensemble The Bel-cordions

Births
Donald Brown (March 28), pianist
Al Di Meola (July 22), guitarist.

1955

Album releases
Herbie Nichols: The Third World 
Ahmad Jamal: Poinciana 
Erroll Garner: Concert by the Sea
George Shearing: Spell
Horace Silver: Horace Silver and the Jazz Messengers
Lennie Tristano: Lennie Tristano
Oscar Peterson: Al Zardis
Frank Morgan: Frank Morgan 
Herbie Nichols: Herbie Nichols Trio

Deaths
Charlie Parker (August 29, 1920 – March 12), saxophonist
James P. Johnson (February 1, 1894 – November 17), stride pianist
Wardell Gray (February 13, 1921 – May 25), saxophonist

1956

Album releases

Charles Mingus: Pithecanthropus Erectus
Modern Jazz Quartet: Django
Modern Jazz Quartet: Fontessa
Thelonious Monk: Brilliant Corners
Sonny Rollins: Saxophone Colossus
George Russell:The Jazz Workshop
Lennie Tristano: Manhattan Studio/ New York Improvisations
Max Roach: Plus Four
John Lewis: Grand Encounter
Horace Silver: Six Pieces of Silver
Kenny Burrell: All Night Long
Lucky Thompson: Tricotism
Phineas Newborn: Piano Artistry
Miles Davis: Round About Midnight
Zoot Sims: Tonite's Music Today
Mel Torme: Touch
Quincy Jones: This Is How I Feel About Jazz
Stan Kenton: Cuban Fire
Jimmy Giuffre: The Jimmy Giuffre Clarinet
Jimmy Smith: A New Star A New Sound
Cecil Taylor: Jazz Advance
John Serry Sr.: Squeeze Play featuring The Bel-cordions

Deaths
Clifford Brown (October 30, 1930 – June 26)
Richie Powell (September 5, 1931 – June 26)
Art Tatum (October 13, 1909 – November 5)
Tommy Dorsey (November 19, 1905 – November 26)

Births
Wayne Krantz (July 26)
Wolfgang Puschnig (May 21)

1957

Album releases
Miles Davis: Birth of the Cool
Charles Mingus: Tijuana Moods 
Art Blakey: Orgy In Rhythm 
Yusef Lateef: Jazz Mood 
John Coltrane: Blue Train 
John Lewis: Piano 
Milt Jackson: Soul Brothers 
Miles Davis: Miles Ahead 
Kenny Burrell: All Day Long 
Ben Webster: Soulville 
Sonny Rollins: Way Out West 
Ben Webster: Tenor Giants 
Art Pepper: Meets the Rhythm Section 
Art Taylor: Wailers 
Max Roach: Jazz in 3/4 time 
Jay Jay Johnson: Blue Trombone 
Hank Mobley: Hank Mobley Quintet 
Herbie Mann: Flute Souffle 
Tito Puente: Top Percussion

Deaths
Sonny Parker (May 5, 1925 – February 7), singer-dancer-drummer
Joe Shulman (September 12, 1923 – August 2), bass
Walter Page (February 9, 1900 – December 20), bass
Jimmy Dorsey (February 25, 1904 – June 12), saxophone

Births
George Letellier (October 11), American pianist and composer

1958

Album releases
Sonny Rollins: Freedom Suite
Dizzy Gillespie, Sonny Stitt, Sonny Rollins: Sonny Side Up
Jimmy Giuffre: Western Suite
Sun Ra: Jazz in Silhouette
Art Blakey: Moanin'
Cecil Taylor: Looking Ahead!
Jimmy Smith: The Sermon!
Blue Mitchell: Big Six
Max Roach: Deeds, Not Words
Clark Terry: In Orbit
Cannonball Adderley: Somethin' Else
Chico Hamilton: Gongs East
Hank Mobley: Peckin' Time
Mongo Santamaria: Yambu
Cal Tjader: Latin Concert
Toots Thielemans: Man Bites Harmonica!
Thelonious Monk: Misterioso
Jimmy Giuffre: The Four Brothers Sound
John Serry Sr. Chicago Musette - John Serry et son Accordéon 
Billie Holiday: Lady in Satin

Deaths
Tiny Bradshaw (September 23, 1905 – November 26)

Births
 Ulf Wakenius (April 16), Swedish guitarist

1959

Events
August 25: Between sets at Birdland in New York City, Miles Davis is beaten by police and jailed.

Album releases
Dave Brubeck – Time Out (Columbia)
Ornette Coleman – The Shape of Jazz to Come (Atlantic)
John Coltrane – Giant Steps (Atlantic)
Miles Davis – Kind of Blue (Columbia)
Johnny Hodges and Duke Ellington – Back to Back: Duke Ellington and Johnny Hodges Play the Blues (Verve)
Milt Jackson and John Coltrane – Bags & Trane (Atlantic)
Charles Mingus – Mingus Ah Um (Columbia)
Art Pepper – Art Pepper + Eleven – Modern Jazz Classics (Contemporary/OJC)
Ella Fitzgerald – Ella Fitzgerald Sings the George and Ira Gershwin Songbook (Verve)

Deaths
Lester Young (August 27, 1909 – March 15)
Sidney Bechet (May 14, 1897 – May 14) 
Boris Vian (March 10, 1920 – June 23)
Billie Holiday (April 7, 1915 – July 17)

Births
Stanley Jordan (July 31), guitarist
Marcus Miller (June 14), bassist and composer
Torsten Zwingenberger (Januar12), German drummer

Awards
Grammy Awards of 1959 
Best Jazz Performance Solo or Small Group

Best Jazz Performance Large Group

Best Jazz Composition of More Than Five Minutes Duration

References

Bibliography

1950s in music
20th century in jazz
Jazz by decade
1950s decade overviews